JSC Konstruktorskoe Buro Priborostroeniya (KBP) ( Joint-Stock Company - Instrument Design Bureau) is one of the main enterprises in the field of Russian defense industry, based in Tula. Its full name goes as "Joint-Stock Company Instrument Design Bureau named after Academic A. G. Shipunov". Its shareholders include High Precision Systems, part of the State Corporation Rostec.

The designing of high-precision weaponry is the priority of the KBP. The enterprise designs air-to-ground, ground-to-air and ground-to-ground weaponry. In addition to these, KBP also develops modern autocannons and grenade launchers. It also manufactures automatic, hand-held and under-slung grenade launchers, sniper rifles, submachine guns, pistols and revolvers for the law enforcement agencies.

History 
KBP was founded on 1 October, 1927 as an organization at Tula Weapons Factory, engaging in designing small arms. The first major success the organization made was in the Red Armory, where its Tokarev pistol was adopted into use in February 1931. In 1936, it was renamed TsKB-14 (Central design bureau No 14). During the Great Patriotic War large successes were made by aviation machineguns such as ShVAK, ShKAS, Berezin UB as well as VYa and Berezin B-20 aviation cannons. Over 80% of the domestic aircraft of the Soviet Air Force were equipped with weapons from the Tula designers.

Post-war years 
Activities of the company were restored under the supervision of engineer-gunsmith Igor Dimitriev during the post-war years. KBP designed the PM, APS pistols, the AM-23 cannon, the 23-mm anti-aircraft cannon 2A7 for the Shilka system, the ZU-23 AAA alongside its dual 2A14 cannons in the 1940s and the 1950s.

The enterprise began designing guided weapons and high-precision missiles in the 1960s.  The Kornet-E AT missile, the Krasnopol M-2 guided-missile system, the Tunguska and the Pantsir-S1 anti-aircraft cannon-missile systems, in addition to the Kashtan CIWS were designed in this period.

Post-Soviet years 
KBP was heavily struck by the drastic reduction in state defence order and the financing of military R&D after 1991. Russia's debt to the KBP reached 20 billion rubles in 1994. Under such conditions the bureau's survival was only possible through the means of export. KBP requested the government of Russia to provide independent military and technical cooperation with foreign countries, and was confirmed and subsequently expanded by an order of the Russian president in 2000. A total of more than 160 designs were made by the KBP up until 1 October, 2012, the 85th anniversary of the founding of the enterprise. By this time the enterprise has integrated over 6500 inventors.

The company was included in the sanction list by the USA in June 2014.

Structure 
KBP's shares are held by OAO NPO Vysokotochnye Kompleksy and State Company Rostec. It has the following subsidiaries:
 TsKIB SOO
 Moscow subsidiary of KBP
 Science Research Center of Biology "Fitogenetica"

Products
The following weapons have been designed by KBP:
 GWS Hermes Guided Weapon System
 Kashtan CIWS
 30F39 Krasnopol 152-mm Laser Guided Projectile
 Drozd active protection system

Small arms
 9A-91 carbine
 ADS amphibious rifle
 VSSK Vykhlop sniper rifle
 VSK-94 sniper rifle 
 OSV-96 heavy precision rifle
 PP-90 folding submachine gun
 PP-90M1 helical-feed submachine gun
 PP-93 submachine gun
 PP-2000 submachine gun/PDW
 P-96 pistol
 GSh-18 pistol
 Udar revolver
 Berkut hunting rifle

Cannons
 2A7
 2A14
 2A28 Grom
 
 
 2A42
 2A72
 AK-630 Gatling cannon
 GShG-7.62 Gatling gun
 Yak-B 12.7 mm Gatling gun
 GSh-30-2 cannon
 GSh-23 cannon
 GSh-6-23 Gatling cannon
 GSh-6-30 Gatling cannon
 ZU-23-2

Grenade launchers
 GM-94 grenade launcher
 AGS-30 grenade launcher

Anti-tank missiles
 9K115-2 Metis-M (AT-13 "Saxhorn-2") anti-tank missile
 9K121 Vikhr (AT-16 "Scallion") anti-tank missile
 9M113 Konkurs (AT-5 "Spandrel") anti-tank missile
 9M133 Kornet (AT-14 "Spriggan") anti-tank missile

Anti-aircraft systems
 Tunguska-M1 (SA-19 "Grison") anti-aircraft system
 Pantsir-S1 (SA-22 "Greyhound") anti-aircraft system
 9M311 anti-aircraft missile

United States sanctions
On July 16, 2014, the Obama administration imposed sanctions through the US Department of Treasury's Office of Foreign Assets Control (OFAC) by adding KBP Instrument Design Bureau and other entities to the Specially Designated Nationals List (SDN) in retaliation for the ongoing Russo-Ukrainian War.

References

External links
 KBP official site English language
 KBP official site Russian language
 Филиал ОАО "КБП" - "ЦКИБ СОО" (KBP - TsKIB COO branch page)
 TsKIB COO current products

Technology companies established in 1927
Firearm manufacturers of Russia
Research institutes in the Soviet Union
Defence companies of the Soviet Union
High Precision Systems
Federal State Unitary Enterprises of Russia
Companies based in Tula Oblast
1927 establishments in the Soviet Union
Golden Idea national award winners
Russian entities subject to the U.S. Department of the Treasury sanctions
Design bureaus